Baikiaea plurijuga, known as African teak, Mukusi, Rhodesian teak, Zambian teak or Zambesi redwood, is a species of Afrotropical tree from the legume family, the Fabaceae from southern Africa.

Description
Baikiaea plurijuga is a medium-sized deciduous tree with pinnate leaves each with 4-5 pairs of opposed leaflets. They show pink to deep mauve flowers have yellow stamens and are clustered in large axillary racemes; it flowers from November to April. The fruit are flattened, woody pods with a hooked tip which splits explosively sending the seeds out over some distance.

Habitat
Baikiaea plurijuga is confined to the Kalahari sands  and the woodland which it dominates is known as Gusu woodland. This woodland grows on the deep, aeolian and fluvial Kalahari Sands which have virtually no clay or silt. These sands provide exceptional growing conditions for deep-rooting trees, but the deficiency in clay restricts tree growth to sites holding nutrients in the form of organic matter.

Distribution
Baikiaea plurijuga occurs in southern Angola, northern Botswana, northern Namibia, southern Zambia and northern Zimbabwe.

Uses
The wood of Baikiaea plurijuga forms a dense hardwood which makes it a difficult wood to work, but it is valued for its termite resistance and resistance to rot, is used for railway sleepers, in construction and for furniture making. Extensive teak forests in some parts of its range (e.g. in Sesheke District, Zambia) have been over-exploited by the commercial timber industry. However, Baikiaea plurijuga is not listed in the CITES Appendices.

Conservation
Baikiaea plurijuga is classified as Near Threatened because its forests have been and considerably reduced as a result of high levels of logging over the last half century. Older, mature trees are also scarce. However, the species geographic range has only diminished by a fraction as the species has the ability to regenerate readily in modified habitats and it tolerates coppicing very well. It is legally protected in Namibia.

References

Detarioideae
Flora of Southern Africa
Trees of Southern Africa
Near threatened flora of Africa
Taxonomy articles created by Polbot